1967 Presidential Cup was the second edition of the national super cup of Turkish Football Federation. The match was contested between 1966–67 1.Lig champions Beşiktaş and 1966–67 Turkish Cup winners Altay.

Match details

See also
 1966–67 1.Lig
 1966–67 Turkish Cup

References

1966
Turkish Super Cup
Presidential Cup 1966